Edelman v. Jordan, 415 U.S. 651 (1974), was a United States Supreme Court case that held that the sovereign immunity recognized in the Eleventh Amendment prevented a federal court from ordering a state from paying back funds that had been unconstitutionally withheld from parties to whom they had been due.

Background
The plaintiff, John Jordan, in a class action suit, sued Illinois officials who administered federal-state of Aid to the Aged, Blind, or Disabled (AABD). He alleged that the program's money had been administered in a way that violated both federal laws and the Fourteenth Amendment to the U.S. Constitution. Specifically, Jordan claimed that the Illinois administrators were applying their own guidelines, which ignored federally-mandated time limits and so did not get aid to applicants fast enough. The federal law required that applicants who qualify receive aid within 30 or 45 days, depending on their condition, but the Illinois agency was taking up to four months to disburse aid, and when such aid was distributed, it was not paid retroactively to the time when the state should have started paying it, according to the federal guidelines. 

Jordan sought relief including a positive injunction to require the state to award him and others in his position the aid that they had missed because of the lateness in processing the applications. The United States District Court found the Illinois guidelines to be inconsistent with the federal statute and ordered Illinois both to follow the federal guidelines and to release to the aid applicants all funds "wrongfully withheld." The United States Court of Appeals for the Seventh Circuit affirmed, and the case was taken to the Supreme Court, with Agency Director Joel Edelmen named as the party representing the State of Illinois.

Issue
Since the 1890 case Hans v. Louisiana, the Eleventh Amendment had been held to recognize the sovereign immunity of states from suits by their citizens. However, the 1908 case Ex parte Young had allowed an exception: citizens could seek injunctive relief against state officials to stop them from carrying out unconstitutional state policies.

In this case, the Supreme Court examined whether a federal court can require a state to restore funds that had wrongfully been withheld from citizens by the state if the order to restore the funds is an injunction, requiring the state to stop its wrongful possession of the funds.

Decision
The Court, in an opinion by Justice Rehnquist, concluded that private litigants could not avoid the bar of state sovereign immunity by manipulating the doctrine of Ex parte Young. No case examining state sovereign immunity had held that states could be required to repay funds that had wrongfully been withheld. In almost all the cases that had permitted retrospective recovery against the states, the state had not raised the issue of state sovereign immunity. The Supreme Court also overruled any cases in which the state had raised the issue and lost.

It distinguished the payment that had been ordered in this case from expenses that a state might incidentally incur after an injunction is issued to comply with it. The costs of post-judgment compliance are ancillary, but the costs of making up for pre-judgment non-compliance were more like an award of damages to the plaintiff. Noting that there were no precedents squarely on this point, the court expressed disapproval of those precedents that hinted at allowing restoration of funds that had been previously withheld.

The Supreme Court also brushed aside an alternative theory raised by the Court of Appeals that Illinois had waived its immunity by participating in the federal program. Previous cases finding such a waiver had involved express language in the Congressional statute conditioning program funds on such a waiver, but in the statute, there was no such language. The Court refused to find that participation in the program constituted "constructive consent." It instead declared that consent to waive immunity from suit could be found only "by the most express language or by such overwhelming implications from the text as will leave no room for any other reasonable construction."

The majority also rejected Justice Marshall's suggestion that plaintiffs could recover under the civil rights statute, 42 U.S.C. § 1983. It noted had nothing in that statute suggested that Congress had intended to abrogate state sovereign immunity by its passage.

Finally, the Court found that it was not improper to consider the state sovereign immunity issue even though the state had not raised it in the trial court since the state sovereign immunity is a jurisdictional bar, which may be raised at any time.

Justice Douglas, Justice Brennan, and Justice Marshall each dissented from the opinion of the Court.

Dissent of Justice Douglas
Justice Douglas asserted that there should be no distinction made between prospective relief and retrospective relief, as the drain on the state's treasury is the same in either case. He also strongly contended that Illinois had waived its immunity by entering the federal program since the Supreme Court had recently found other states to have waived immunity by joining similar programs. Therefore, Douglas reasoned that Illinois had to have been aware of the possibility that entering the program would waive its own immunity, and its decision to participate in light of that danger showed a willingness to be held liable.

Dissent of Justice Marshall
Justice Marshall argued that 42 U.S.C. § 1983, which permits parties to sue state actors to recover for civil rights violations, also abrogated the immunity of the states and permitted a recovery from the state treasury if the rights of a citizen were violated by an official of the state.

Dissent of Justice Brennan
Justice Brennan's opinion did not reach any of the questions on the limitations of sovereign immunity or waiver thereof that were considered by both the Court and the other dissents. Instead, Brennan argued that the Eleventh Amendment does not immunize states from being sued by their citizens at all. He stated there is no question of what the purported immunity covers or whether it can be waived it does not exist. He noted that the Eleventh Amendment's language bars only suits against a state by citizens of other states. That leaves common law sovereign immunity, which he asserted to have been surrendered by the states when they agreed to join into the United States.

See also
 List of United States Supreme Court cases, volume 415

References

External links
 

United States Supreme Court decisions that overrule a prior Supreme Court decision
United States Supreme Court cases
United States Eleventh Amendment case law
1974 in United States case law
United States Supreme Court cases of the Burger Court